Arvid Hanssen (28 July 1932 – 31 July 1998) was a Norwegian journalist, newspaper editor, poet, novelist and children's writer.

Biography
Hanssen was born in Vika at Indre Senja in Troms.   He completed Finnsnes High School in  1948.  He graduated from Moldenæs University College in Tromsø in 1951.   Hanssen became as a journalist in 1957. He became the editor of the newspaper Senjens Blad  from 1957 to 1962. From  1963 he was editor of the magazine Midnattsol. In 1972, Hanssen became a full-time author and song writer.

His songs reached a wide audience through Tove Karoline Knutsen's 1980 album Blå kveill, which was based on Hanssen's lyrics. He received a number of prizes, including the Prøysen Prize in 1982, The Fritt Ord Honorary Award in 1984, and the Cappelen Prize in 1985.

He was married in 1958 with Ingebjørg Langhaug. He was the father of freelance journalist Arne Ivar Hanssen and author Sigrid Merethe Hanssen.   
He died at  Dyrøy in Troms. Lenvik municipality  named Arvid Hanssens plass after him. A bust of the writer  is located outside the cultural centre in Finnsnes.

References

1932 births
1998 deaths
People from Lenvik
Norwegian newspaper editors
20th-century Norwegian poets
Norwegian male poets
Norwegian children's writers
20th-century Norwegian novelists
Norwegian male novelists
20th-century Norwegian male writers